The Under-17 Baltic Cup is an annual football competition for under-17 national football teams organised by the Baltic states and Finland.

Results

Performance by country

See also 
 Baltic Cup
 Under-21 Baltic Cup
 Under-19 Baltic Cup

References 

Under-17 association football
Youth football competitions
Sport in the Baltic states
International association football competitions in Europe
International association football competitions hosted by Estonia
International association football competitions hosted by Finland
International association football competitions hosted by Latvia
International association football competitions hosted by Lithuania
Recurring sporting events established in 2008